Sina Samadi (born 7 April 1985), known by his stage name Sean Banan ("Sean Banana") is an Iranian-Swedish comedian and musician. His family immigrated to Sweden when he was 2 years old and resided in Gothenburg. Samadi took lessons in rumba, flamenco, rock, cha-cha-cha, ballet and street dance. He then worked as a choreographer and dance instructor. In 2006, he appeared on TV3's now defunct dance programme Floor Filler. He became an immediate internet phenomenon after appearing in an interview in 2007 after answering some questions about his preferences and said he preferred  (buttocks) to breasts. Rumpa became a catch phrase he would use in many of his future gigs.
 
He played a travelling reporter in the 2010, comedy television show Cirkus Möller that aired on TV4. The same year he took part in the Kanal 5's programme Djävulsrallyt in its third series.

His 2010 single "Skaka Rumpa" was released on 16 June 2010, and entered the Swedish Singles Chart at No. 13 in its first week, topping at No. 8 the following week.

Samadi took part in Melodifestivalen 2012, with "Sean den förste Banan" that passed the Semi-final stage, but was eliminated in the "Second Chance" round without reaching the finals. But despite this, the song proved very popular reaching number 3 on Sverigetopplistan, the official Swedish Singles Chart.

In Melodifestivalen 2013, he took part with "Copacabanana". After performing in the semi-final in Scandinavium, Gothenburg, he came 1st and qualified directly to the final, where he finished in 6th place.

Samadi's first film Sean Banan inuti Seanfrika was released in 2012, and was panned by critics.

Filmography

Appearances in films
2010: Skills as Stretch
2012: Sean Banan inuti Seanfrika as himself

Appearances in TV series
2006: Floor Filler (dance)
2010: Cirkus Möller (comedy)
2010: Djävulsrallyt
2010: Sommarkrysset
2011: Helt magiskt
2011: ''Äntligen fredag

Discography

Albums

Singles

References

External links
Official website
MySpace

Living people
Swedish comedians
Iranian emigrants to Sweden
1985 births
21st-century Swedish singers
Melodifestivalen contestants of 2013
Melodifestivalen contestants of 2012